Voorleser was the title given to a highly responsible citizen in New Netherland and later Dutch colonies, who had semi-official duties in local law, education and religion.

Origin and use
The word voorleser as used in English texts is a variant of the Dutch word voorlezer, which means "one who reads (to others)". However, both spellings are used interchangeably when referring to the collective official title used by colonial Dutch Americans. It has several different translations or interpretations, such as "lay reader", "public reader", "fore-reader", and "church reader". The title was predominantly used from the mid-17th century to the late 18th century; in the small colonial villages of this era, one person could maintain many tasks.

After the English took over the Dutch settlements of New Netherland, the existing Dutch settlers continued relying on the voorleser for maintaining village records and documentation. The last person given the title of voorleser resigned in 1789, where his successor was given the title of "clerk". Documentation in the Dutch settlers' native language, however, lasted until 1809. The title and tasks of the voorleser disseminated after the populations grew beyond the ability of one person to maintain, and the majority of settlers began speaking and keeping records in English.

Duties
The voorleser had numerous local duties and was considered a highly important member of the community by the early settlers. Each voorleser had jurisdiction over virtually all legal and religious actions and ceremonies in their community. Voorlesers required scholarly qualities, as they acted as the village clerk and schoolmaster, typically educating the youth in the same building where religious services were held.

As a de facto minister, occasionally reading the scriptures, the voorleser would also be responsible for baptisms, communicants and marriages. When a death occurred in the community, voorlesers were given full charge of funerary tasks, serving as an undertaker, grave-digger, or sexton, and attending the burial of the dead. The voorleser would also lead the congregation in singing during church services, and in the absence of a proper pastor, the voorleser would perform the ceremonies on Sabbath, which consisted of prayers and typically, a prepared sermon by a highly regarded theologian from the Netherlands. They also would read the law and creed, as well as portions of the Psalms.

Notable voorlesers
Stuynhuysen, Engelbert – Old Bergen's first voorleser, gaining the title in 1662.
Bertholf, Guiliam – began working in Harlem, New York City on April 24, 1690.
Sickels, Abraham – Old Bergen's last voorleser, retired in 1789.

Advisory boards
Other prominent members in the community of New Amsterdam (which included all the settlements around the Upper New York Bay) were part of councils that advised the Director of New Netherland. Called upon at various times during the colony's existence, they were known as the Twelve Men, the Eight Men and the Nine Men.

See also

Voorlezer's House

References

New Netherland
Afrikaans words and phrases
Dutch words and phrases